2C (2C-x) is a general name for the family of psychedelic phenethylamines containing methoxy groups on the 2 and 5 positions of a benzene ring. Most of these compounds also carry lipophilic substituents at the 4 position, usually resulting in more potent and more metabolically stable and longer acting compounds. Most of the currently known 2C compounds were first synthesized by Alexander Shulgin in the 1970s and 1980s and published in his book PiHKAL (Phenethylamines i Have Known And Loved). Shulgin also coined the term 2C, being an acronym for the 2 carbon atoms between the benzene ring and the amino group.

Legality

Canada
As of October 12, 2016, the 2C-x family of substituted phenethylamines is a controlled substance (Schedule III) in Canada.

See also
 25-NB
 N-(2C)-fentanyl
 Substituted phenethylamines
 Substituted amphetamines
 Substituted methylenedioxyphenethylamines
 DOx
 Substituted tryptamines

References 

 
Chemical classes of psychoactive drugs
Phenethylamines